Tristis est anima mea is the second responsory of the Tenebrae for Maundy Thursday. The Latin text refers to Christ's Agony in the Garden of Gethsemane, a part of his Passion.

Text

The theme of the text of the second responsory for Maundy Thursday is Jesus in the garden Gethsemane, addressing his disciples.

In the King James Version, the beginning of the Latin text, told in the first person, is translated as "My soul is exceeding sorrowful".

While the first two lines are quoted from the bible, the last two lines of are free anonymous poetry, predicting they will see a crowd, they will flee, and Jesus will go to be sacrificed for them.

Responsorium:

Versus:

Translations are offered by the Episcopal Church and the Roman Catholic Church:

Responsorium:

Versus:

Settings

Motets and other musical settings based on the responsory:
A motet by Orlande de Lassus, for instance included as No. 1 in the Drexel 4302 manuscript
A motet by Pomponio Nenna included in Sacrae Hebdomadae Responsoria (posthumously published in 1622)
Méditation №3 in "Méditations pour le Carême, H.380-389" by Marc-Antoine Charpentier
A setting included in Officium Hebdomadae Sanctae (1585) by Tomás Luis de Victoria
A 1611 responsory by Carlo Gesualdo: "... begins with desolate, drooping figures that conjure Jesus’ prayer in Gethsemane ... It then accelerates into frenzied motion, suggesting the fury of the mob and the flight of Jesus’ disciples. There follows music of profound loneliness, radiant chords punctured by aching dissonances, as Jesus says, “I will go to be sacrificed for you.”"
A setting by Pedro de Cristo
TriC 26ad, a responsory by Giuseppe Corsi da Celano
A setting by Pierre Robert
A SSATB motet attributed to Johann Kuhnau
A responsory in F major (Seibel 104) by Johann David Heinichen
No. 2 of Responsoria pro hebdomada sancta, ZWV 55, by Jan Dismas Zelenka
A motet by Lorenzo Perosi
Fourth of Quatre motets pour un temps de pénitence by Francis Poulenc
The opening movement of Part III (eleventh movement overall) of Franz Liszt's oratorio Christus
 An a capella choir piece (SATB) by Henk Badings Latin text

References

External links

Tenebrae